is a Japanese television drama starring Yuji Oda and Yuto Nakajima. The drama is based on the American television series of the same name by Aaron Korsh. Its first season aired on Fuji TV from October 8 to December 17, 2018. The second season's first two aired April 13 and 20. Production of the season was postponed due to the COVID-19 pandemic, but resumed on June and aired from July 27 to October 19.

Cast 
 Yuji Oda as Shogo Kai is based on Harvey Specter.  
 Yuto Nakajima as Daiki Suzuki is based on Mike Ross. 
 Yuko Araki as Makoto Hijirisawa is based on Rachel Zane
 Honami Suzuki as Chika Yukimura is based on Jessica Pearson
 Anne Nakamura as Kayako Tamai  
 Hayato Isomura as Yusei Tanimoto
 Mio Imada as Sari Tanimoto
 Jun Kunimura as Shinji Yanagi
 Reiko Tajima as Yui Suzuki
 Shinya Kote as Mitsugi Kanie

References

External links
  
 

2018 Japanese television series debuts
2018 Japanese television series endings
Fuji TV dramas
Japanese drama television series
Japanese legal television series
Japanese television series based on American television series
Suits (American TV series)
Television series by Universal Television